Chamata is a village in Nalbari district, in Assam, India.
As per 2011 Census of India, Chamata has a population of 6,114 people including 3,102 males and 3,012 females, and with a literacy rate of 81.04%.

One of the notable colleges in Chamata is Kamrup College, established in 1966.

References 

Draft-Class geography articles
Draft-Class Indian geography articles